Eurycheilichthys is a small genus of armored catfishes native to South America.

Taxonomy
Eurycheilus pantherinus was first described in 1992 by Roberto Esser dos Reis and Scott A. Schaefer. However, Eurycheilus was preoccupied in fossil cephalopods, and therefore was replaced by Eurycheilichthys in 1993. E. limulus was described in 1998.

Eurycheilichthys together with Pseudotocinclus, Microlepidogaster, Schizolecis, Otothyris and Pseudotothyris form a clade whose sister group is Epactionotus.

Species
There are currently two recognized species in this genus:
 Eurycheilichthys limulus Reis & Schaefer, 1998
 Eurycheilichthys pantherinus (Reis & Schaefer, 1992)

Distribution
Both species in this genus are endemic to Brazil.

Description
The two species of Eurycheilichthys are similar. The trunk and caudal peduncle are round in cross section. Males have a fleshy flap along the posterior margin of the thickened first pelvic fin ray. They lack a dorsal fin locking mechanism. Both species lack an adipose fin. Their bodies are almost entirely covered by plates. The body and head lack crests. The head and body plates are covered with odontodes; these are larger on the ventral face of pelvic and pectoral fin spines. Odontodes on the head and trunk are otherwise of uniform size and distribution, and not arranged in conspicuous rows. The lips are roundish, wide and papillose. The maxillary barbels are short.

E. limulus shares with E. pantherinus a single synapomorphy: the derived presence of seven branched pectoral fin rays. E. limulus is distinguished from E. pantherinus by a more narrow body, head and dorsal trunk with series of longitudinal light stripes (versus scattered dark blotches), and presence of an accessory ceratobranchial flange and filamentous gill rakers (versus absence of those features in E. pantherinus).

Ecology
E. pantherinus inhabits shady, fast-flowing, shallow water, ranging from approximately 200–500 metres in elevation. The substratum is predominantly stones, with little or no macrophytes.

The habitat at the type locality of E. limulus is a small river about 3–5 metres wide with moderate water current, bottom comprising some rocks but mostly sand and a large amount of marginal vegetation. These fishes live among leaves and stalks.

References

Otothyrinae
Fish of South America
Catfish genera
Taxa named by Roberto Esser dos Reis
Taxa named by Scott Allen Schaefer
Freshwater fish genera